Horacio de la Peña and Diego Nargiso were the defending champions, but Nargiso did not compete this year. De la Peña teamed up with Boris Becker and lost in the first round to Marcos Górriz and Jan Gunnarsson.

Andrés Gómez and Javier Sánchez won the title by defeating Ivan Lendl and Karel Nováček 6–4, 6–4 in the final.

Seeds
The first four seeds received a bye into the second round.

Draw

Finals

Top half

Bottom half

References

External links
 Official results archive (ATP)
 Official results archive (ITF)

1992 ATP Tour